Marc Stendera (born 10 December 1995) is a German professional footballer who plays as an attacking midfielder for  club VfB Oldenburg.

Club career
During the 2012–13 season he had his first Bundesliga appearance when Eintracht played Bayern Munich at home when he was substituted for Marco Russ in the 71st minute. Stendera had the assist in Frankfurt's 1–0 (Russ) win against Schalke 04 on 21 April 2013, his first start in the Bundesliga.

Stendera amassed 56 appearances and scored 5 goals for Eintracht throughout the 2014–15 and 2015–16 seasons, but a series of injuries limited his first-team action during his three last years at the club. He was released from his contract on 2 September 2019 and joined Hannover 96 on the following day.

On 28 December 2022, Stendera agreed to join 3. Liga club VfB Oldenburg on a contract from 2 January 2023.

International career
Stendera represented the Germany national youth football team at U17, U18 and U19 level. He was with the Germany U17 side in 2012 which made it to the final of the UEFA European U17 Championship but lost to the Netherlands on penalties. Stendera also represented Germany U19 in Hungary 2014. He made four assists, one of which came in the final against Portugal. Germany  won that match 1–0 with Hany Mukhtar's goal in 39th minute and secured their second U19 title after their 2008 triumph.

Honours
Individual
UEFA European Under-19 Championship: Team of the Tournament
 FIFA U-20 World Championship Bronze Boot: 2015

References

External links
 
 

1995 births
Living people
Sportspeople from Kassel
German footballers
Footballers from Hesse
Association football midfielders
Germany youth international footballers
Germany under-21 international footballers
Bundesliga players
2. Bundesliga players
3. Liga players
Regionalliga players
Eintracht Frankfurt players
Eintracht Frankfurt II players
Hannover 96 players
FC Ingolstadt 04 players
VfB Oldenburg players